X is the sixth studio album by American singer Chris Brown. It was released on September 16, 2014, by CBE Entertainment and RCA Records. The album serves as the follow-up to his fifth album Fortune (2012). Brown for the album worked with several producers, including RoccStar, Danja, Nic Nac, Diplo and others. The album also features guest appearances by various urban artists, including Kendrick Lamar, R. Kelly, Akon, Nicki Minaj, Usher, Trey Songz, Tyga, Rick Ross, Brandy, Lil Wayne, Jhené Aiko and Aaliyah.

The release date of the album was delayed several times due to RCA's choices and the singer's legal problems throughout the last months of 2013 and the first half of 2014. Initially, the album release was set for July 16, 2013, then for August 20, 2013, then for May 5, 2014, and finally released on September 16, 2014. X was preceded by five singles: "Fine China", "Don't Think They Know", "Love More", "Loyal" and "New Flame". The album's fourth single "Loyal" became its most successful, by peaking at number nine on the US Billboard Hot 100 and at number ten in the United Kingdom. Pushing the promotion for the album further, Brown performed and appeared at several televised music events and music festivals across the United States.

The working of the album started in 2012 and ended in August 2014. The album's aesthetics feature a black and white imagery, handled by Brown himself along with art director Courtney Walter. X is an R&B album, also containing songs influenced by disco, soul and hip-hop. Its lyrical content focuses on falling in love, internal conflict and sexual desire. The album divided reviewers: while most praised the album’s sound, others criticized the songwriting and album's length. At the 2015 Grammy Awards, the album was nominated for the Best Urban Contemporary Album, while "New Flame" was nominated for Best R&B Performance and Best R&B Song.

Commercially, the album debuted at number two on the US Billboard 200 selling 146,000 copies in its first week, becoming Brown's first album to miss the summit of the chart since Graffiti (2009) and his third album to go to number two on the chart overall following Exclusive (2007). It also became his sixth consecutive top ten debut in the United States. By the end of 2015, the album had sold 404,000 copies in the United States. It has been certified double platinum by the Recording Industry Association of America (RIAA).

Background
On November 8, 2012, in an interview with Power 106's (KPWR) at Los Angeles, California, Brown debuted the dance-pop track titled "Nobody's Perfect". The song was supposed to be the first single for his upcoming sixth album, under the working title of Carpe Diem, which was due to be released in 2013. However the single was never released, Brown changed idea on the concept for the album, and after concluding his Carpe Diem Tour in the last days of 2012, Brown's next studio album started to develop. MTV News confirmed the development of the album, with Brown collaborating with producers, such as Timbaland, Danja and Diplo, among others.

On March 26, 2013, Brown announced the release of X, in various interviews and listening sessions. In an interview with Ebony, Brown spoke of taking his music in a different direction and changing his sound from the pop-infused and sexually explicit one of the previous album Fortune, to a more mature, soulful and vulnerable theme for the album. He said during an interview for Rolling Stone: 

During the same interview for Rolling Stone, Brown explained the significance of the title: 

Sputnikmusic described this reasoning as "numerological" and "idiotic", and in any case the album missed this date.

Recording and production
In March 2013, Brown spoke about working with artists and producers, such as Pharrell Williams, Ariana Grande, Kendrick Lamar, Ludacris, Rihanna, Nicki Minaj, Wiz Khalifa, Timbaland, Diplo, Danja and RoccStar. On July 4, 2013, Brown confirmed different guest features on the album, including Nicki Minaj, Kendrick Lamar, Rihanna, Wiz Khalifa, B.o.B and Kelly Rowland, among others. However, various artists announced didn't make the cut for X. At the same time, the production would be confirmed by Timbaland, Diplo, Polow da Don, Danja, Pharrell and Drumma Boy.

Brown said that while making the record he wanted to "take the Quincy Jones approach" to his music, trying to hear what was in rotation on the radio as little as possible, locking himself in a recording studio with the producers, so that the album could've come out as authentic as possible.  On August 5, 2014, Brown said that he ended the recording sessions for the album, and that he had "about 50 songs" to sift through and perfect for X.

Music and lyrics 

X is an R&B record, with its sound being noted by Andy Kellman of AllMusic for being "clean and diversified". Disco influences stand out in songs like "Add Me In", "Time for Love", "Lost in Ya Love", "Fine China" and "No Lights". The album also contains hip-hop infused songs with productions that feature heavy-bass, double-claps and "candy" synths that can be heard in "Loyal", "Came to Do" and "Love More". Brown's vocal performances on the album were commended by critics for showcasing his timbre. His vocals in songs like "X", "Lady in a Glass Dress", "Autumn Leaves" and "Do Better" were defined to be "soul-driven". Xs lyrical content focuses on falling in love, the difficulty of managing emotions and sexual desire. Ivan Rytlewski of The A.V. Club, in his review for the album, defined it as a "loveful and reflective record", delineated by "some of Brown's bad boy aesthetics". Martín Caballero of USA Today found its songwriting to be a mixture of "romantic love, mature reflection, sexual passion, playboyness and desire".

The album's opener "X", produced by Diplo, was described as a "progressive R&B" track by Rytlewski, saying that "it starts as a quiet and calm song, then exploding during a powerful chorus made off Brown strong vocals over an electronic drop". The song's lyrics depict his admissions on his past errors and his desire to prove his growth. On "Autumn Leaves", according to Brad Wete of Billboard, Brown "examines a fleeting love with gloominess and a high level of sensitivity", comparing a lover's departure with summer's, in time for fall. "It seems that all the autumn leaves are falling/ I feel like you're the only reason for it.", while the guest Kendrick Lamar, raps on Brown's behalf, mood-swinging from thoughtful to vicious: "And they won’t let me live/ Even when it’s remorse that I give/ When are they gon' rejoice and forgive/ Tell me how [do] I stay positive?". "Do Better" was described by Wete as "a sparse and pensive duet" where Brown and Brandy play the two sides of a relationship where both feel like scorned lovers that don't know how to deal with their emotions, singing: "I learn more and more each day that I don't know me / It's like I can't get out of my own way". "Add Me In" is an up-tempo disco and R&B song with math-tinged lyrics about subtracting a girl's boyfriend to "add me in".

"Songs On 12 Play" is a pure R&B slow-jam, duetted with Trey Songz, about wild sex, with lyrics that pay homage to R. Kelly works, citing lots of his song, as well as his classic debut studio album 12 Play. The track is followed by the interlude "101", where the singer expresses his sexual desire to the directly concerned lady, and subsequently by a collaboration with R. Kelly himself on the lustful "Drown In It". Both "Loyal" and "Stereotype" are centered on unfaithful women, while "Time for Love" and "Lady in a Glass Dress" talk about falling in love, with the last one being a promise to a girl recovering from a rough breakup that he "can make your dreams come true". Los Angeles Timess writer Mikael Wood defined "Lost In Ya Love" as a "melodious, sweet mid-tempo" where the singer expresses "the beauty of being romantically in love" to the directly concerned lady. On the album's standard edition closing track, "Drunk Texting", Brown and Jhené Aiko play the role of two people that try to numb the pain of their heartbreak drinking alcohol, but end up texting their loved one while they're drunk.

Release and promotion
On February 15, 2013, the singer unofficially released the song "Home", with an official videoclip, where he expresses a reflection on the bitter price of fame, and on how the only moment of respite from that thought is when he returns to the neighborhood where he grew up with people who knew him from the start. On March 26, 2013, Brown definitively confirmed the title and release of "X", telling Rolling Stone that he was working on the song "X" with Diplo, "Autumn Leaves" with Kendrick Lamar, and he said he was considering the inclusion of "Put It Up", a collaboration with Rihanna, though his violence against her in 2009 was still an issue with the public.

On April 29, 2013, Brown announced a release date of July 16 for X, also unofficially releasing a song called I Can't Win. In July Brown previewed several unreleased songs through his social media accounts, also announcing that the album's release date was pushed back to August 20, 2013. However, it was later revealed that the album has been pushed back again to November 19, 2013. In the same month, Brown stated that the album will be a double disc album with 10 songs on each disc, and was now due on December 3.

On November 20, 2013, Brown was sentenced to an anger management rehabilitation center for three months, putting the December 2013 release of X in jeopardy. To "hold [fans] over until [the X album] drops," Brown released a mixtape, titled X Files on November 19, 2013, which consists of six tracks and features guest appearances from Busta Rhymes, Ludacris and Kid Ink, including the song "Main Chick". On February 22, 2014, it was announced that the album would be released on Brown's birthday, May 5, 2014. On April 14, 2014, Brown released a teaser of new track "Don't Be Gone Too Long" featuring Ariana Grande, however, the song and album were again delayed due to Brown's prison sentence. On August 6, 2014, the album cover shot by Eliot Lee Hazel was revealed. The title track "X" was released as an instant-gratification track alongside the album pre-order on iTunes on August 25, 2014. The album was finally released on September 16, 2014, promoted through radio and magazine interviews, and by performing tracks of the album live in various televised shows. Brown embarked on his 2015 Between the Sheets Tour along with Trey Songz and Tyga.

Singles
The album's lead single, titled "Fine China", was released on March 29, 2013, and it was sent to US rhythmic contemporary radio the following day. The production on the song was handled by RoccStar and PK. The song has since peaked at number 31 on the US Billboard Hot 100.

The album's second single, titled "Don't Think They Know", was released on June 17, 2013, and it was sent to rhythmic contemporary radio in the United States on July 1, 2013. The song features a posthumous appearance from R&B singer Aaliyah, while the production on the song was handled by Mel & Mus. The music video was shot in Los Angeles, California, and was released on June 17, 2013.  Aaliyah appears as a hologram which are actually scenes from Aaliyah's 2000 video "Try Again" and 1996's "If Your Girl Only Knew". The song has since peaked at number 81 on the US Billboard Hot 100.

The album's third single, titled "Love More" featuring Nicki Minaj, was announced, which Brown performed the song along with Minaj at the 2013's BET Awards. On July 19, he released its cover artwork. On July 16, the song was released for digital download and a week later, the song was sent to rhythmic contemporary radio. The music video was officially released on August 17, 2013. The song has since peaked at number 23 on the US Billboard Hot 100.

On December 19, 2013, the album's fourth single, titled "Loyal", was released for digital download on iTunes. There are two versions to the song, the "West Coast Version" featuring Lil Wayne and Too Short, while the "East Coast Version" featuring Lil Wayne, and another rapper French Montana. In March 2014, the third and final version officially was released, featuring Lil Wayne and Tyga. The song has been commercially successful, reaching at number nine on the US Billboard Hot 100 and number 10 on the UK Singles Chart, making it Brown's highest-charting single from X in both countries.

On June 26, 2014, Brown previewed the track, titled "New Flame" featuring Usher and Rick Ross, along with the cover artwork on his Instagram account. The song was released on June 30, 2014, as the album's fifth single. The song peaked at number 27 on the US Billboard Hot 100.

Other songs
The track "Don't Be Gone Too Long", was announced for single release for March 25, 2014, which in its original form features Ariana Grande. However, due to Brown's prison sentence, the single was eventually scrapped on March 17, even though the music video had already been filmed.

The title track "X", was released as an instant-gratification track alongside the album pre-order on iTunes on August 25, 2014. It peaked at number 98 on the US Billboard Hot 100.

Critical reception

According to review aggregator Metacritic, X received “generally positive” reviews, with a score of 63/100.

Many reviewers complimented the album's production and overall sound. Brad Wete of Billboard gave the album a largely positive review, and said "Once gratuitous fillers are skipped, gems appear, especially on the closing half, where Brown is lucid about his tabloid love life." Miranda Johnson of XXL gave the album an XL (4/5), and argued that "X certainly proves that Chris Brown’s talent will forever shine through over whatever troubles come his way." An anonymous staff editor of Sputnikmusic gave the album a glowing 3.8/5, and simply stated, "It is simply a good collection of good songs, put together by talented folks to showcase their obvious talents." Andy Kellman of AllMusic gave the album 3 and a half stars out of five, and enjoyed the albums diverse sound, while disliking some of the material, and said midway in the review that, "Brown combines memorable hooks with some stellar production work on the rubbery disco-funk of "Add Me In" (courtesy of Danja) and the blithe, swaying "Time for Love" (a collaboration with Jean Baptiste and Free School). In these and a few other songs, romantic affection, expressed with seemingly genuine sweetness, takes precedence over sexual aggression and petulance."

Other reviewers found issues with the length and content of the album. Evan Rytlewski of The A.V. Club gave the album a B-, and stated that while he found the album more appealing than Brown's previous releases, argued that "Running 21 tracks and 75 minutes in its deluxe edition, X sometimes threatens to be too much. But there’s enough appealing material to support that runtime." Marcus Dowling of HipHopDX gave the album a mixed score of 3 out of 5, and criticized Brown's personality and the album's structure, while arguing that "Personality aside, Chris Brown’s ability to succeed artistically at delivering sounds in all three sectors of urban Pop makes this release a great, yet disjointed listen." Christopher Weingarten of Rolling Stone was largely divided in his review of the album, stating that "Chris Brown's sixth album is adventurous musically and a total mess lyrically – it's almost defiantly oblivious to his past as a domestic-abuser. Throughout, Brown plays the victim..." while also arguing that the content was "a shame", because "It's a shame, because X is full of great beats", and gave the album 2 and half stars out of 5.

Other reviews were more negative. In another review with the score of 2 and a half stars out of five, Alexa Camp of Slant Magazine found the length of the album and the inclusion of R. Kelly "a good case" of considering the album an act of abuse, likening it to his legal troubles, while also questioning the use of mathematical metaphors throughout the album. In the near closing moments of her review, she stated that "Aside from the standout club banger "Add Me In," which is steeped in arithmetic and trigonometry metaphors, and "101," which finds Brown doing "101 on the 101," the album's lyrics largely eschew mathematical objects in favor of soul-baring like "Autumn Leaves" and sex talk like "Songs on 12 Play," which likens a girl to a song from the titular R. Kelly album." She also stated at the end of her review that title track was "an admirable attempt to take responsibility for his anger-management issues" while also finding that it was only after "seemingly placing the blame on others, specifically on-and-off-again girlfriend Rihanna"  Joe Caramanica argued that "X is one of his least ambitious releases." and gave the album 2 out of 5 stars. Jim Farmer of New York Daily News agreed, and found that while there was a large wave of support for Brown, he had only wished that "... the new songs supported him as strongly."

Accolades

Commercial performance
The album debuted at number two on the US Billboard 200, with first-week sales of 146,000 copies in the United States. In its second week, the album dropped to number six on the chart, selling 36,000 copies. In its third week, the album dropped down to number nine on the chart, selling 23,000 copies. In its fourth week, the album dropped down to number 21 on the chart, selling 16,000 copies. By November 2015, the album has sold 404,000 copies in the United States. On October 1, 2021, X was certified double platinum by the Recording Industry Association of America (RIAA), for combined album sales, on-demand audio, video streams, track sales equivalent of two millions.

In 2014, X was ranked as the sixty-second most popular album of the year on the Billboard 200.

Track listing
Credits adapted from the album's liner notes.Sample credits'
 "Loyal" contains a portion of the composition "Money Ain't a Thang", written by Steve Arrington, Charles Carter, Shawn Carter, Jermaine Mauldin, Wuang Hankerson and Roger Parker, performed Jay-Z featuring Jermaine Dupri.
 "Loyal" contains a portion of the composition "Shine", performed by Cash Money Millionaires.
 "Songs on 12 Play" contains portions of the compositions "Sex Me" and "Stroke You Up", written by R. Kelly.
 "Don't Think They Know" contains a sample from "Don't Think They Know", written by Benjamin Bush and Jeffrey Walker, performed by Aaliyah; and a portion of the composition "They Don't Know", written by Jonathan Buck, Tim Kelley and Bob Robinson, performed by Jon B.

Personnel

 Aaliyah – featured artist
 Jhené Aiko – featured artist
 Akon – featured artist
 Ambience & Soundz – producer
 The Anonymous – producer
 Marcella Araica – mixing
 B.A.M. – producer
 Babydaddy – producer
 Mario Bakovic – producer
 Jean Baptiste – producer
 Brandy – featured artist
 Chris Brown – creative director, executive producer, primary artist
 Tommy "TBHITS" Brown – producer
 Darhyl "DJ" Camper Jr. – producer
 Maddox Chhim – assistant
 Daniel Coriglie – producer
 Tom Coyne – mastering
 Danja – producer
 Diplo – producer
 Steven Franks – producer
 Free School – producer
 Abel Garibaldi – engineer
 Glass John – producer
 Mark "Exit" Goodchild – vocal engineer
 Trehy Harris – assistant
 Eliot Hazel – photography
 Jaycen Joshua – mixing
 Count Justice – producer
 Ryan Kaul – assistant
 R. Kelly – featured artist, producer
 Kendrick Lamar – featured artist
 Lil Wayne – featured artist
 Donnie Lyle – music direction
 Majors – programming
 Mel & Mus – producer
 Ian Mereness – engineer
 Natural – engineer
 Nic Nac – producer
 Nicki Minaj – featured artist
 Brent Paschke – guitar
 Dennis-Manuel Peters – producer
 Mark Pitts – executive producer
 Razihel – producer
 RoccStar – producer
 Rick Ross – featured artist
 Brian Springer – engineer, mixing, vocal engineer
 Andrew Swanson – drum programming
 Trey Songz – featured artist
 Tyga – featured artist
 Usher – featured artist
 Cooper Sebastian – graphic artist
 Courtney Walter – art direction, creative director, design

Charts

Weekly charts

Year-end charts

Certifications

Release history

References

External links
 

2014 albums
Chris Brown albums
Albums produced by Danja (record producer)
Albums produced by Diplo
RCA Records albums
Albums produced by Drumma Boy
Albums produced by Polow da Don
Albums produced by R. Kelly